The Northern Song canon (北宋刊経) was a printed collection of Buddhist texts produced in the Northern Song dynasty.

It was the first printed edition of a Chinese Buddhist canon, and effectively closed the canon.

It was begun in 971 and completed in 983.

References 

Mahayana sutras
Tripiṭaka
Chinese Buddhist texts
Song dynasty literature